Novourazayevo (Yañı Urazay) is a rural locality (a village) in Arlansky Selsoviet, Krasnokamsky District, Bashkortostan, Russia. The population was 184 as of 2010. There are 4 streets.

Geography 
Novourazayevo is located 32 km south of Nikolo-Beryozovka (the district's administrative centre) by road. Novobaltachevo is the nearest rural locality.

References 

Rural localities in Krasnokamsky District